Prefixes that are used for radio and television are usually allocated by ITU. They also form the basis for, but do not exactly match, aircraft registration identifiers. But in some cases, especially among amateur radio operators other, by ITU unallocated, callsigns are used when operating from disputed areas or countries that are internationally not (yet) recognized. 
They can be:
 unofficial - used by individuals without any issued permit
 temporary - issued by local authority
 official - recognized internationally by different organisations

Prefixes for those stations are either unallocated or unavailable by ITU definitions.

ITU unallocated and unavailable call sign prefixes

Unallocated: The following call sign prefixes are available for future allocation by the ITU. (x represents any letter; n represents any digit from 2–9.)

 E8, E9, H5, J9, On, S4, T9*, Un, V9, Xn, YZ*, Z4–Z7, Z9, 4N*.

(* Indicates a prefix that has recently been returned to the ITU.)

Unavailable: Under present ITU guidelines the following call sign prefixes shall not be allocated . 
(x represents any letter; n represents any digit from 2–9.)
 nn, x0, x1, 0x, 1x, Qx.
 no prefixes beginning with Q are used—they may be confused with Q codes.
 no prefixes with the digits 1 or 0 are used—they may be confused with the letters I or O.
 two digit prefixes (nn) are not as yet considered by the ITU.

Table of Non-ITU radio prefixes

See also
 ITU prefix
 Amateur radio call signs
 Aircraft registration

References

External links 
Article: Kosovo - New DXCC entity?
Prefix List (by CT2FZI)
Northern Cyprus 1B: radio amaterur or radio pirate?
Article: 1A: DX Entity with a 900 Year History
Operational Bulletin No. 1149 (1.VI.2018)

Call signs
Amateur radio call signs